Sefid Tameshk (also Romanized as Sefīd Tameshk) is a village in Sakht Sar Rural District, in the Central District of Ramsar County, Mazandaran Province, Iran. At the 2006 census, its population was 634, in 183 families.

References 

Populated places in Ramsar County